William Amos Bancroft (April 26, 1855 – March 11, 1922) was a Massachusetts businessman, soldier and politician who served in the Massachusetts House of Representatives and on the Common Council, Board of Aldermen, and as the Mayor of Cambridge, Massachusetts (1893–1897).

Bancroft was the president of the Boston Elevated Railway Company from 1899 to 1916.

During the Spanish–American War, Bancroft was a brigadier general of United States Volunteers.

Life and career 
William was born on April 26, 1855, in Groton, Massachusetts, to Charles Bancroft and Lydia Emeline (Spaulding) Bancroft. He attended Lawrence Academy in his hometown and Phillips Exeter Academy in New Hampshire. After graduating from Phillips Exeter, he attended Harvard Law School, where he enlisted in the fifth regiment of the state militia in his Freshman year.

Bancroft died on March 11, 1922, in Cambridge, Massachusetts. He was buried in Groton Cemetery alongside his parents.

Notes

|-

1855 births
1922 deaths
Mayors of Cambridge, Massachusetts
Cambridge, Massachusetts City Council members
Harvard College alumni
Harvard Law School alumni
Members of the Massachusetts House of Representatives
Boston Elevated Railway